Teatro Alfredo Mesquita is a theatre in São Paulo, Brazil. Inaugurated on 1 December 1988, it is used for presentations of dance performances, theater and houses a small orchestra. The name of the theatre is a posthumous tribute to the founder of the School of Dramatic Art (EAD), Alfredo Mesquita.

References

Theatres in São Paulo